Jennifer L. "Jen" Royle (born September 3, 1974) is a former American sports reporter and writer who is known for working for the YES Network as a New York-based reporter for the MLB New York Yankees baseball team from 2003 to 2006. She is also known as a chef and contestant on ABC's The Taste and Food Network's Beat Bobby Flay.

Early life and education
Royle, a native of Mansfield, Massachusetts was born to Francis K. "Frank" Royle (1945-2006) and Dianne (Borriello) Royle.  She attended Mansfield High School in Mansfield, Massachusetts and graduated in 1992. Later that year, she attended Salve Regina University and graduated in 1996 with a bachelor's degree.

Sports Reporter Career
In 2003, her career began when she was hired as a clubhouse reporter by the YES Network where she would be a regular broadcaster to the New York Yankees before departing in 2006. Her very first interview was at a locker room at the old Yankee Stadium, where she would ask players questions after the game between the Yankees and the Red Sox.

After three years working at YES, she worked for the MLB Advanced Media, providing coverage from the New York Yankees clubhouse – regular season and postseason games. Conducted exclusive one-on-one on-camera interviews with various Yankees & MLB players, managers and coaches. In May 2008, she joined XM Satellite Radio where she would be reporting two New York City baseball teams such as the New York Yankees and the New York Mets before leaving in 2009. A year later, she joined MASN, a Baltimore/Washington D.C. based regional sports network which airs Baltimore Orioles and Washington Nationals games. She then moved on to WJZ-FM in Baltimore, where she became a beat reporter/radio co-host for Orioles and Baltimore Ravens coverage.

A year prior, she worked for the SB Nation as an MLB Columnist for 5 months before leaving in 2012. Next year later, she would join WEEI-FM, a radio station based in Lawrence, Massachusetts, where she served as radio talk show host. Same year later, she joined the Boston Herald, serving as a news reporter for covering the Boston Celtics, Boston Red Sox, Boston Bruins and the New England Patriots.

Culinary career
Royle appeared in season three of the ABC cooking show The Taste  and that's when she made the decision to focus exclusively on cooking. She worked at Mario Batali's Babbo in the Seaport, then launched a private cooking company.

In January 2019, she launched a new career as a chef with the opening of a restaurant in Boston. In 2020 she opened TABLE Mercato, an Italian market next door to TABLE restaurant. And in 2021, she opened her third location, a Gelateria called TABLE Caffe.

Personal life
She has two brothers. Royle's father died in 2006 due to complications of lung cancer.

References

External links

 

Major League Baseball broadcasters
American reporters and correspondents
American sports journalists
Living people
1974 births
YES Network
American chefs
American women chefs
Women sportswriters
American television personalities
American women television personalities
The Taste contestants
People from Boston
People from Mansfield, Massachusetts
Mansfield High School alumni
Salve Regina University alumni
American women journalists
Women sports announcers
American people of Italian descent
21st-century American women